Black Saint is an album by American jazz saxophonist Billy Harper recorded in 1975 for the Italian Black Saint label. The album was the first release for the record label.

Reception 
The Allmusic review by Glenn Astarita awarded the album 4½ stars calling it "one of the finest modern jazz releases of the '70s... Vigorously recommended". The Penguin Guide to Jazz Recordings says it is “the album people associate with Harper, a strong, eclectic blend of blues, hard-edged rock patterns and the by now familiar preaching style.”

Track listing 
All compositions by Billy Harper.
 "Dance, Eternal Spirits, Dance!" – 6:52 
 "Croquet Ballet" – 13:02 
 "Call of the Wild and Peaceful Heart" – 21:22 
Recorded at Barclay Studios in Paris, France, on July 21 & 22, 1975

Personnel 
Billy Harper – tenor saxophone, cowbell
Virgil Jones – trumpet
Joe Bonner – piano
David Friesen – bass
Malcolm Pinson – drums

References 

Black Saint/Soul Note albums
Billy Harper albums
1975 albums